Delila (minor planet designation: 560 Delila) is a minor planet orbiting the Sun. It was named after the biblical character Delilah in Saint-Saëns's opera Samson et Dalila, which was first performed in German translation.

References

External links 
 
 

000560
Discoveries by Max Wolf
Named minor planets
000560
000560
19050313